Uqbar Editores is a Chilean independent publishing company founded in 2006. Since its founding it has been characterized by the versatility of its catalog, which encompasses publications including specialist knowledge such as wealth bailout, without putting aside publishing trends of the market.

History 
Uqbar was established in the second half of 2006 under the publishing management of Isabel Buzeta, professor of languages and literature graduate, who had already worked at Random House Mondadori (now Penguin Random House Grupo Editorial, the Spanish language division of Penguin Random House), Grupo Editorial Norma, and Editorial Grijalbo. The publisher emerged from the necessity for Buzeta to link to projects which, for marketing reasons, would have been rejected by transnational publishing groups.

The name of Uqbar Editores is a homage to the story "Tlön, Uqbar, Orbis Tertius" by Argentinian writer Jorge Luis Borges.

Collections and imprints 
Uqbar possesses collections of cinema, fiction, architecture, politics, historical accounts, journalism and psychology. It also distributes works of other Chilean publishers, such as Sangría Ediorial and Ediciones Kultrún.

Publications  
2014

2013

2012

References

External links 
Uqbar Editores official website

Book publishing companies based in Santiago
Book publishing companies of Chile
Publishing companies established in 2006